Ayşe Sultan ("The living one" or "womanly"; 1605 or 1608 – 1657) was an Ottoman princess, daughter of Sultan Ahmed I (reign 1603–17) and Kösem Sultan, half-sister of Sultan Osman II (reign 1618–22) and sister of Sultan Murad IV (reign 1623–40) and Sultan Ibrahim (reign 1640–48) of the Ottoman Empire. Ayşe is known for her many politically motivated marriages.

Life

Early life
Born in Istanbul, Ayşe Sultan was one of Ahmed's daughters by his favourite consort Kösem Sultan. Her birth date is variously estimated as 1605, 1606, or 1608,. When mentioning her and Nasuh Pasha's 1612 wedding, 17th-century historian Mustafa Naima refers to Ayşe as "the youngest of the princesses".

Ottoman princesses were normally married away, to influential Ottoman officials, by their mothers or paternal grandmothers, who had the right to arrange their marriages and arranged matches which could be of political use.  They had privileges in marriage which separated them from other Muslim females: such as the right to be the only wife of their spouse, to refuse to consummate their marriage until they were ready, and to contract a divorce when they pleased.  Due to many of them marrying as children and being widowed and divorced several times, often for political reasons, remarriages were very common.  Ayşe and her sister, Fatma Sultan are extreme examples of this: they were married at least  seven times, and entered into their last engagement at the ages of about 50 and 61, respectively.

Of the total number of Ayşe's husbands, two were executed, one was assassinated and two fell in battle.

1st marriage
Ayşe Sultan was married firstly in 1612 to Gümülcineli Nasuh Pasha (d. 1614), Grand Vizier 1611–14. The celebrations of their engagement and wedding ceremonies, as well as those of her sister Gevherhan Sultan and Öküz Kara Mehmed Pasha, which took place in succession over a number of months of 1611 and 1612, were sponsored by Ahmed, and were so elaborate and extravagant that they were observed by the public as if they were festivals marking the end of wars the Sultan had promised. In July of the latter year, the little princess was taken in great pomp to her husband's palace, where he would eventually be executed in her presence, much to her distress. This palace, located opposite the quay known as Salacak in Üsküdar, she retained as her own property.

2nd marriage
While still a child, Ayşe was married secondly to Karakaş Mehmed Pasha (d. 1621), Beylerbey (governor-general) of Buda. However the man soon died while fighting in Osman II's military campaign against Poland, the marriage thus lasting less than a year.

3rd marriage
In 1626 her mother Kösem Sultan offered her hand in marriage to Hafız Ahmed Pasha (1564– 10 February 1632), Grand Vizier 1625–26, 1631–32; she wed the sixty-year-old man either in the same year or on 13 March 1627.

4th marriage
Only a month after the murder of Hafiz Pasha during a Janissary revolt against her brother Murad IV, Ayşe was betrothed to Murtaza Pasha (d. 1636), beylerbey of Diyarbekir  and Vizier, the nuptials though not being held until his arrival at the imperial capitol of Constantinople in 1635.

This old and ailing husband she strongly disliked, according to Venetian reports, died – thus saving her from a unhappy life – during Murad's military campaign against Revan, which took place in the course of the Ottoman–Safavid War (1623–1639).

5th marriage and 6th marriage
She was next married in 1639 to Ahmed Pasha (d.1644), beylerbey of Aleppo and Damascus, and in March 1645 to Voynuk Ahmed Pasha (d. 28 July 1649), beylerbey of Adana, Vizier, Admiral of the Fleet12/22 June 1648 – 28 July 1649.

In 1643, early in the reign of her brother Ibrahim "the Mad", Ayşe is recorded, like her sisters Fatma Sultan and Hanzade Sultan, as receiving the maximum daily stipend for imperial princesses of the time, namely 400 aspers; yet, later, in circa 1647,  the three of them as well as their niece, Murad's daughter Kaya Sultan, were subjected, on what was another assault of the protocol on Ibrahim's part, to the indignity of subordination to his concubines.   He took away their lands and jewels (presumably to award them to his Hasekis), and made them serve Hümaşah Sultan, the concubine he married, by standing at attention like servants while she ate and fetching and holding the soap, basin and pitcher of water with which she washed her hands. 
Because of what he believed was their failure to serve his beloved Hümaşah properly, the Sultan then banished them to Edirne Palace.

7th marriage
Some five or six years after her sixth husband Voynuk Ahmed Pasha died in battle, by rifle fire,  during the Cretan War (1645–1669), in 1654  or 1655, Ayşe was betrothed to rebel Ibşir Mustafa Pasha (d. 11 May 1655). Thanks to her appeal Mustafa Pasha was given the post of Grand Vizier.

She apparently anxiously awaited her intended husband's arrival  – which he delayed for months  – for she dispatched several emissaries to bring him to the capitol. Her head servant, Mercan Ağa, finally succeeded in the task, and when Ibşir and his troops reached her palace in Üsküdar she treated him and the statesmen that had come to receive him to a great banquet, "like a feast of Hatem Tay", according to Evliya Çelebi. Their wedding took place on 28 February 1655. Their life together was short, ending upon his execution.

Issue
By her third husband, Ayşe had two sons:
Sultanzade Mustafa Bey (1628 - 1670)
Sultanzade Fülan Bey 

It is not known if she had other children.

Death
Ayşe Sultan most probably died in or around 1656–1657. She was entombed in her father Sultan Ahmed I's mausoleum in Sultan Ahmed Mosque.

Charities
In 1618, Ayşe Sultan had a water dispenser built between what is today Okçubaşı avenue and the tramway railway in Istanbul.

Depictions in literature & popular culture
Ayşe Sultan is a character in Güngör Dilmen's (1930-2012) one-woman play I, Anatolia (Ben, Anadolu), featuring Anatolian women "from time immemorial to the early twentieth century".
In 2015 Turkish historical fiction TV series Muhteşem Yüzyıl: Kösem, an adolescent Ayşe Sultan is portrayed by Turkish actress Sude Zulal Güner.

See also
 List of Ottoman Princesses

Ancestry

References

Sources
 
 Çelebi, Evliya. 1991 [1659]. “Kaya Sultan (1659).” In The Intimate Life of an Ottoman Statesman: Melek Ahmed Pasha (1588–1662) As Portrayed in Evliya Çelebi's Book of Travels (Seyahat-Name). Ed. Robert Dankoff. Albany: SUNY Press, pp. 221–36.
 
 
 
 
 
 
 
 
 

17th-century Ottoman princesses